Barbara McLachlan is an American politician, educator, and former journalist serving as a member of the Colorado House of Representatives. She represents District 59, which covers Archuleta, Gunnison, Hinsdale, La Plata, Ouray, and San Juan counties.

Early life and education
Hall McLachlan was born in Lakewood, Colorado. She received a bachelor's degree in journalism from Colorado State University, a bachelor's degree in English from Fort Lewis College, a master's degree in learning and teaching from Regis University, and a certificate in college counseling from the University of California, Los Angeles.

Career 
Prior to entering politics, McLachlan worked as a Durango High School and as an independent college consultant. She had previously worked as a journalist for the Durango Herald.

McLachlan was elected to the Colorado House of Representatives in 2016, winning with 50.73% of the vote over incumbent Republican J. Paul Brown. McLachlan serves on the House Education Committee and the House Transportation & Energy Committee. She is the chair of the House Education Committee.

Personal life 
Her husband, Mike McLachlan, had previously served in the Colorado House of Representatives. She lives in Durango, Colorado and has two children.

References

External links
Official campaign website

21st-century American politicians
Living people
Democratic Party members of the Colorado House of Representatives
Women state legislators in Colorado
Colorado State University alumni
People from Durango, Colorado
Year of birth missing (living people)
21st-century American women politicians